The 2010–11 Ohio Bobcats men's basketball team represented Ohio University in the college basketball season of 2010–11. The team was coached by John Groce and played their home games at the Convocation Center. They finished the season 19–16 and 9–7 in MAC play to finish tied for third in the MAC East.

Before the season

Roster changes

Recruiting

Roster

Preseason
The preseason poll and league awards were announced by the league office on October 28, 2010.  Ohio was picked first in the MAC East

Preseason men's basketball poll
(First place votes in parenthesis)

East Division
 Ohio 128 (12)
 Kent State 114 (8)
 Akron 104 (4)
 Miami 84
  42
 Buffalo 32

West Division
  124 (12)
  122 (8)
 Eastern Michigan 88 (2)
 Western Michigan 68
 Northern Illinois 64 (2)
  38 points

Tournament champs
Ohio (10), Kent State (6), Central Michigan (4), Ball State (2), Akron (2)

Preseason All-MAC 

Source

Coaching staff

Schedule 

|-
!colspan=9 style= | Exhibition

|-
!colspan=9 style= | Regular season

|-
!colspan=9 style="" | 

|-
!colspan=9 style="" |

Statistics

Team Statistics
Final 2010–11 Statistics

Source

Player statistics

Source

Awards and honors

All-MAC Awards 

Source

References

Ohio Bobcats men's basketball seasons
Ohio Bobcats
Ohio
Bob
Bob